La Femme Magnifique International Pageant is an annual drag pageant. In Portland, Oregon, the event has been hosted by Darcelle XV.

See also

 Drag pageantry
 LGBT culture in Portland, Oregon

References

External links
 

Annual events in Portland, Oregon
Drag events
LGBT culture in Portland, Oregon
LGBT events in Oregon